Leslie Andrew Alexander Wilkie (27 June 1878 – 4 September 1935) was an Australian artist and the president of the South Australian Society of Arts from 1932 to 1934.

Early life
Wilkie was born at Royal Park, Melbourne, the son of David Wilkie and Mary Frances, née Rutherford. He was a grand-nephew of Sir David Wilkie. He was educated at Brunswick College and in 1896 entered the National Gallery of Victoria school at Melbourne under Lindsay Bernard Hall.

Art career

Wilkie came first into notice in 1902 when he showed some very promising work at the Victorian Artists' Society exhibition. He went to Europe in 1904 for further study, and after his return to Australia was appointed acting master of the drawing school at Melbourne while Frederick McCubbin was on leave. Wilkie was elected a member of the council of the Victorian Artists Society, and after the foundation of the Australian Art Association was its honorary secretary for three years.
He was for several years, an illustrator on the staff of The Argus and The Australasian.

In September 1926 he was appointed curator of the Art Gallery of South Australia at Adelaide and proved himself a most efficient and painstaking officer. In 1934 he joined a University of Adelaide anthropological expedition to Central Australia where he painted portraits of Aborigines near Cooper Creek. The portraits were later exhibited at the Art Gallery of South Australia.

Wilkie died in Adelaide on 4 September 1935 after an operation for appendicitis. He married Nani Tunnock, who died in 1930, and was survived by a daughter, Nora Wilkie (1874–1950), a noted artist. Andrew Wilkie (c. 1853–1948), director of the Melbourne Zoo 1923 to 1936, was an uncle.

References

1878 births
1935 deaths
20th-century Australian painters
Australian art gallery directors
Australian people of Scottish descent
People from Parkville, Victoria
Australian art curators
Artists from Melbourne
National Gallery of Victoria Art School alumni